Wang Dayuan (fl. 1311–1350), courtesy name Huanzhang, was a Chinese traveller of the Yuan dynasty from Quanzhou in the 14th century. He is known for his two major ship voyages.

Wang Dayuan was born around 1311 at Hongzhou (present-day Nanchang).

During 1328–1333, he sailed along the South China Sea and visited many places in Southeast Asia. He reached as far as South Asia and Australia, and landed in modern-day Bengal, Sri Lanka, and India, as well as areas close to modern-day Darwin, Australia. In 1334–1339 he visited North Africa and East Africa.

Around 1330, Wang visited the island of Singapore, where he wrote about a small settlement called Danmaxi that had both Malay and Chinese residents, and already had an established Chinatown. His 1349 account of his travel, Dao Yi Zhi Lue (A Brief Account of Island Barbarians), is one of the few records documenting the early history of Singapore.

References

Chinese explorers
Yuan dynasty people
Explorers of Africa
Explorers of Asia
History of Kerala
Chinese travel writers

Hokkien people